was one of Japan's most prominent postwar playwrights, novelists, and essayists, associated with the Angura ("underground") theater movement in Japan. He won a name for himself as a writer in the "nonsense" genre and helped lay the foundations of the Japanese "theater of the absurd." His works focused a lot on the aftermath of the war and especially  the nuclear holocaust.

Early life 
Minoru Betsuyaku was born in the Japanese colony of Manchuria in 1937. Betsuyaku's early years were difficult because in addition to experiencing severe deprivation during World War II, his father also died.
In July 1946, a year after the sudden Soviet invasion of Manchuria,  his mother succeeded in repatriating by ship with her children. Then the family moved to Sasebo in Kyushu and spent two years in Kochi, his father’s hometown. Then they moved to Shimizu where Betsuyaku finishes high school before he went to Tokyo for university. He actually wanted to become a painter in high school, however, his relatives strongly disapproved of this career path. Therefore, Betsuyaku enrolled in Waseda University in 1958 with the intention to become a newspaper correspondent. In his first day of school, his upperclassman suggested that he look into becoming an actor since he was tall. That is why he joined a drama club called Jiyu Butai where he met Tadashi Suzuki, a director who would start the Waseda Little Theater Company with Betsuyaku.

Career and influences 
Before being involved in Waseda Little Theatre Company, Betsuyaku dropped out of college to be involved in a protest movement in 1961. This protest movement focused on stopping the establishment of a military base in the island, Niigima. These were political demonstrations against the renewal of the United States-Japan Security Treaty. When he returned from this hiatus, Suzuki and his friends wanted to do a separate play from their drama club, Jiyu Butai, at the Waseda festival. So Betsuyaku wrote his first play, A and B and a Certain Women, for them in 1961.
	
His first play, A and B and a Certain Women, is about a man B who felt inferior to man A. Man B was being continuously derided by man A that man B kills man A. It contains a lot of characteristics of “silence” and “irresolvable conflict”.

The main influence on him at that time was films. His play, A and B and a Certain Women, was inspired by the film called An Eye for an Eye in 1957, which had a similar plot with unstoppable conflict. However, that was not the only influence. The main influence was from Beckett. Samuel Beckett came around when the theater was getting the end of the “realism” plays. Realism plays are plays that have three sided walls and a fourth wall which is only present to the actors. It would usually have many props and background objects to make the play realistic. However, Betsuyaku’s work was like Beckett’s work in the sense that it had no walls and it had very little background objects. For example, some of the plays would only have a telephone pole just like a lone tree in Beckett’s Waiting for Godot. Betsuyaku called this the “Beckett’s space”.
Also, a realism play would have complex characters with names to make the play very realistic. However, Betsuyaku’s and Beckett’s plays had simple characters with no names. This style of play was unique and was able to be open to many interpretations. For example, the character’s names were identified as man A and man B instead of Paul or John.

Style of work 
His career really took off when he joined the Waseda Little Theater Company. He created many works with the principle of “theater of the absurd;” however, his style of play did change multiple times along the way. For example, he moved into the concept of “isolation” in his plays. This happened in the post-war period. His motivation for this was the “animosity and agony” aroused by the condition of times. Betsuyaku believed that “the moment we understood that it is a solitude resulting from animosity and agony, that solitude could become a weapon”. However, this theme disappeared in his writing by the 1980s.

Betsuyaku was also influenced by Anton Chekhov during his career. He focused mainly on “Japanizing” Chekhov’s work. For example, Betsuyaku wrote his play, Three Sisters in a Thousand Years based on Chekhov's Three Sisters. The plot and characters were not changed but the setting has been changed to Japan. Betsuyaku is trying to say that meaning of life is completely lost and that it is empty to search for identity. This is referring to the people of Japan after the loss in World War II.

Personal life
He left Waseda Little Theatre in 1968, and in 1970 he married actress Yuko Kusunoki who has been an indispensable partner in many productions of Betsuyaku’s work, especially in her small theatre group, the Snail Theatre Group [Katatsumuri no Kai] (1978–99). In
1971 a daughter was born.

Awards 
 1968 – 13th “New Theatre” Kishida Kunio Drama Award (“The Little Match Girl” and “A Scene With A Red Bird”)
 1971 – Kinokuniya Theater Award (“A Town and a Blimp” and “Alice in Wonderland”)
 1972 – “New Artist” Award of the Ministry of Education’s Selected Artists Encouragement Awards (“The Revolt of the Breeze Tribe”)
 1987 – Yomiuri Literature Award (“The Story of the Two Knights Traveling Around the Country” and other plays)
 1988 – Minister of Education Award for the Arts (“Giovanni’s Journey to His Father”)
 1997 – Cultural Award of Hyogo Prefecture
 1998 – Special Award of the 39th Mainichi Art Award
 2007 – Kinokuniya Theater Award (“Godot Has Come” and “If a Dog Turns to the West, Its Tail Faces the East”)
 2008 – 11th Tsuruya Nanboku Play Award and the Asahi Award (“Godot Has Come”)

Famous works 
 A to B to Hitori no Onna (A and B and a Certain Woman) [1961]
This is a work that shows a fight resulting from unidentified animosity and feelings of inferiority between two men A and B who deride each other and argue.

 Match Uri no Shojo (The Little Match Girl) [1966]
It is about a woman paying a visit to the home of an ordinary middle-class elderly couple. She makes a claim that she was the daughter of the couple. She brings herself a younger brother and her children to the house. It is a work that criticizes the postwar attitude of pretending that the war had never happened.

 Zō (The Elephant) [1962]
It is one of his most famous plays and was first presented by Jiyu Butai (Free Stage). It is a story about a patient who is victim of the atomic bombing and has a strange desire to show off his scar from a bomb. He is doing this to get sympathy and applause from his audiences. His nephew tries to stop him from these actions and tries to convince him that nobody in the audience neither loves nor hates or cares about the atomic bombing victims.  Also he tries to convince his uncle that victims should suffer the pain in silence. These contradicting characters provide the audience with the information of how the victims of the war are dealing with the pains.

 I Am Alice [1970]
Alice lives in a country where a republican government and a monarchy exist simultaneously. Alice is then given double sentences of exile by these two organizations. Alice rediscovers her true identity during the exile and tells the world, "I Am Alice”. This work tells us that a person must find their true self once again.

 Suji de Kakareta Monogatari – “Shinou Dan” Tenmatsuki (a story told in numbers – the end of the “let’s die group”) [1974]
Seven men and women have gathered for “Rite of Death by Starvation”. They isolated themselves with the intention of dying, but they must starve together as a group.

 Godot Has Come [2007] – Godot Has Come is based on Samuel Beckett's “Waiting for Godot”. The story is about two men, Estragon and Vladimir, who wait for a person named Godot. Godot Has Come had all the same characters and plot as Waiting for Godot and adds a twist to it. There are two women who meet Estragon and Vladimir while waiting for Godot. Before long, Godot does arrive. He looks like a traveler, wearing a trench coat and carrying a suitcase and an umbrella. He lets everybody know that he is Godot and that he has arrived. But by the time Estragon and Vladimir hear the news; they already have their hands full with other things to do. It turns out that the lady waiting for the bus may be Estragon’s mother and that the child carried by the other woman may be Vladimir’s son. This play is to portray that they were too busy with their real lives and forgot what/who they were waiting for.

References

Further reading
Cody, Gabrielle H., and Evert Sprinchorn. The Columbia Encyclopedia of Modern Drama. New York: Columbia UP, 2007. Print.
Kennedy, Dennis. The Oxford Encyclopedia of Theatre & Performance. Oxford: Oxford UP, 2003. Print.
Miller, J. Scott. Historical Dictionary of Modern Japanese Literature And: Theater. Lanham, MD: Scarecrow, 2009. Print.
"On Waiting and Forgetting -." Stories of the Mirror. N.p., 30 Aug. 2012. Web. 8 June 2015.

1937 births
2020 deaths
Japanese people from Manchukuo
20th-century Japanese dramatists and playwrights
Yomiuri Prize winners